Richard McMahon may refer to:
 Richard McMahon (pianist), English pianist and music professor
 Richard McMahon (bailiff), British barrister and Bailiff of Guernsey
 Richard Randolph McMahon, lawyer from West Virginia